129 may refer to:

 AD 129, a year of the Julian calendar
 129 (number), the natural number that follows 128
 129 BC, a year  of the Julian calendar
 129 (East Riding) Field Squadron, Royal Engineers
 129 (New Jersey bus)
 LZ 129 Hindenburg, an airship
 Henschel Hs 129, a German World War II ground-attack aircraft
 Soviet submarine K-129
 129 (barge), an American whaleback barge

See also
 List of highways numbered 129